Lide can refer to:

 -lide, a chemistry suffix indicating an sp-hybridized carbanion ionically linked to a metal
 Saint Lide, a legendary bishop

People
 Alice Alison Lide
 Lide Meriwether